The 2013 Boston Cannons season was the 13th season for the Boston Cannons of Major League Lacrosse. The Cannons tried to build on their 9–5 playoff season in 2012 after winning their first Steinfeld Cup in 2011.

Standings

External links
 Team Website

Boston Cannons
Boston Cannons
Boston Cannons
Major League Lacrosse seasons